Hans-Peter Schaller (born 5 September 1962) is an Austrian football manager.

References

1962 births
Living people
Austrian football managers
Indonesia Super League managers
Persiba Balikpapan managers
Grazer AK managers
TSV Hartberg managers
Wiener Sport-Club managers
Laos national football team managers
PSM Makassar managers
Bali United F.C. managers
Austrian expatriate football managers
Austrian expatriate sportspeople in Indonesia
Expatriate football managers in Indonesia
Austrian expatriate sportspeople in Laos
Expatriate football managers in Laos
Austrian expatriate sportspeople in Ghana
Austrian expatriate sportspeople in Qatar